

Walther Risse (13 December 1892 – 21 June 1965) was a German general in the Wehrmacht who commanded the 225th Infantry Division. He was a recipient of the  Knight's Cross of the Iron Cross with Oak Leaves of Nazi Germany.

Awards and decorations

 Clasp to the Iron Cross (1939) 2nd Class (15 May 1940) & 1st Class (4 June 1940)
 German Cross in Gold on 30 September 1944 as Generalleutnant and commander of 225. Infanterie Division
 Knight's Cross of the Iron Cross with Oak Leaves
 Knight's Cross on 22 September 1941 as Oberst and commander of Infanterie-Regiment 474
 Oak Leaves on 18 January 1945 as Generalleutnant and commander of 225. Infanterie Division

References

Citations

Bibliography

 
 
 

1892 births
1965 deaths
Lieutenant generals of the German Army (Wehrmacht)
Recipients of the clasp to the Iron Cross, 1st class
Recipients of the Gold German Cross
Recipients of the Knight's Cross of the Iron Cross with Oak Leaves
German prisoners of war in World War II held by the Soviet Union
Military personnel from Saxony
German Army generals of World War II
German Army personnel of World War I